Filottrano is a comune (municipality) in the Province of Ancona in the Italian region Marche, located about  southwest of Ancona. 
 
Filottrano borders the following municipalities: Appignano, Cingoli, Jesi, Montefano, Osimo, Santa Maria Nuova.

Lardini, the international fashion company, is based in Filottrano.

References

External links

 Official website

Cities and towns in the Marche